Demons at the Door is a 2004 American supernatural horror film directed by Roy Knyrim. It stars Rick Benedetto, Leslie Brockett, Sean'e La'Dae, Bob Cicherillo, Richard Elfman (under the pseudonym "Aristide Sumatra"), and Angelo Benedetto. Featuring music by the American hip hop duo Insane Clown Posse, the film was released direct-to-video.

Plot

Cast
 Rick Benedetto as Sgt. Rick Castellano
 Leslie Brockett as Annie Scara
 Sean'e La'Dae as Rudy Ray Jackson
 Bob Cicherillo as Uriel
 Richard Elfman as Monkey Demon (credited as Aristide Sumatra)
 Angelo Benedetto as Dr. Angelo Scara

Reception
Richard Propes of The Independent Critic said, "There are so many things wrong with this film."

References

External links
 

2004 horror films
2000s supernatural horror films
American supernatural horror films
Demons in film
Insane Clown Posse